Courts of Judicial Magistrate of Second Class are at the lowest hierarchy of the Criminal Court structure in India. According to the Section 11 of the Criminal Procedure Code, 1973 (CrPc), a Court of Judicial Magistrate of Second Class may be established by the State Government in consultation with the High Court of the respective state at such places in the district and in any number by a notification.

According to Section 29(3) of the CrPC., a Judicial Magistrate of Second Class may pass a sentence of imprisonment for a term not exceeding one year, or of fine not exceeding Five thousand (in madhya pradesh 25 thousand)  rupees, or of both.

A Judicial Magistrate of Second Class cannot entertain a Prayer for Police Remand while hearing for police files. If the police remand prayer is received, the same must be kept reserved and the case record must immediately be sent to Judicial Magistrate 1st Class.

A Judicial Magistrate can try such offences which is triable by either "Any Magistrate" or "Judicial Magistrate 2nd Class" as enshrined in the Schedule I & II of the Cr.PC.

Generally, the post for Judicial Magistrate 2nd Class is to be held for 6 months by the newly inducted officers unless the concerned Hon'ble High Court of a State pleased to seem fit to reduce or increase the time period of 6 months.

A production Warrant issued by a Judicial Magistrate 2nd Class must be countersigned by the Chief Judicial Magistrate as per Section 267 Cr.PC

References 

Judiciary of India